The Texas version (or East Texas version) of the NWA World Tag Team Championship was the main tag team professional wrestling championship in the Dallas/Houston-based Southwest Sports territory of the National Wrestling Alliance. While the name indicates that it was defended worldwide, this version of the NWA World Tag Team Championship was mainly defended in the eastern part of Texas. The championship was created in 1957 and actively promoted by Southwest Sports until 1968, when it was abandoned. The championship was later brought back by the Dallas-based World Class Championship Wrestling (WCCW) promotion in 1981, and was used until 1982 when WCCW decided to use the NWA American Tag Team Championship as their top tag team championship. As it is a professional wrestling championship, it is won not by actual competition, but by a scripted ending to a match.

The NWA Board of Directors allowed any member of the NWA to create a version of the NWA World Tag Team Championship, which led to as many as 13 identically-named championships active in 1957. From 1959 until 1969 there was a second NWA World Tag Team Championship promoted in Texas, referred to as the Amarillo version or the West Texas version; this was later replaced with the NWA Western States Tag Team Championship.

The first championship team was that of Verne Gagne and Wilbur Snyder, who were awarded the championship in July 1958 by Southwest Sports. The last recorded champions of the Southwest Sports era were Mr. Ito and Chati Yokochi, who won the championship on December 12, 1968, with the championship being abandoned in 1969 or 1970. When the championship was reintroduced in 1981, promoter Fritz Von Erich brought in the team of Hercules Ayala and Ali Mustafa, billing them as champions from a different region to give the championship an air of legitimacy. The last champions were Fritz's son Kerry Von Erich and Al Madril, who won the championship in April 1981. The longest-reigning championship team was Pepper Gomez and Rocky Romero, whose reign in the Southwest Sports era lasted between 274 and 303 days. Due to vague records of the time, the exact number of days that various championship reigns lasted is impossible to determine, as is which team held the championship for the shortest amount of time. The Von Brauners (Kurt and Karl Von Brauner) hold the record for most reigns as a team, a total of four, while Pepper Gomez and Duke Keomuka both held the championship six times with different partners.

Title history
Key

Team reigns by combined length
Key

Individual reigns by combined length
Key

See also
National Wrestling Alliance
NWA World Tag Team Championship

Footnotes

Concurrent championships
Sources for 13 simultaneous NWA World Tag Team Championships
NWA World Tag Team Championship (Los Angeles version)
NWA World Tag Team Championship (San Francisco version)
NWA World Tag Team Championship (Central States version)
NWA World Tag Team Championship (Chicago version)
NWA World Tag Team Championship (Buffalo Athletic Club version)
NWA World Tag Team Championship (Georgia version)
NWA World Tag Team Championship (Iowa/Nebraska version)
NWA World Tag Team Championship (Indianapolis version)
NWA World Tag Team Championship (Salt Lake Wrestling Club version)
NWA World Tag Team Championship (Amarillo version)
NWA World Tag Team Championship (Minneapolis version)
NWA World Tag Team Championship (Texas version)
NWA World Tag Team Championship (Mid-America version)

References

National Wrestling Alliance championships
Tag team wrestling championships
Professional wrestling in Texas
World Class Championship Wrestling championships
World professional wrestling championships